The Great Britain women's national under-20 basketball team is a national basketball team of Great Britain, administered by the British Basketball. It represents the country in women's international under-20 basketball competitions.

FIBA U20 Women's European Championship participations

See also
Great Britain women's national basketball team
Great Britain women's national under-18 basketball team

References

External links
Archived records of Great Britain team participations

Basketball in the United Kingdom
National youth sports teams of the United Kingdom
Women's national under-20 basketball teams